Eilfried Huth (born 1 December 1930) is an Austrian architect who lives and works in Graz. Huth is best known for participatory housing projects, in which future residents of the housing estates are included in the planning process.

Life and education 
Huth was born in Pangalengan, Indonesia. For three years, Huth attended the National Political Institutes of Education, which was housed in the monastery of Sankt Paul im Lavanttal. He studied at Graz University of Technology from 1950 to 1956. After graduating from the university, he worked for the architect Emmerich Donau until 1962. From 1962 to 1975, Huth and Günther Domenig worked together as a team, with offices in Graz and Munich. From 1971 to 1972, Huth was visiting professor at University of Kassel. From 1985 to 2005, he was Professor at the Berlin University of the Arts.

Architectural career 

The first buildings by Huth are typical functionalism of the late 1950s. The respective clients for the school building in Leoben (1956–1958) and the high-rise office building in Zeltweg (1957–1960) came from the mining sector. Until 1968, Huth continued planning further buildings in Leoben and Zeltweg, specializing in steel construction. After a phase of modernist functionalism, Huth turned to structuralism and brutalism. Together with Günther Domenig, he designed buildings with exposed concrete which are among the outstanding examples of brutalism in Austria. Both the Pedagogical Academy Graz and the Oberwart Parish Church were commissioned by the Catholic Church. The Research and Computing Center (FRZ) of the VÖEST Alpine Montangesellschaft in Leoben is considered structuralist architecture. Huth designed the outer shell of the building with weathering steel, a façade material that was new at the time. A much-noticed design from this phase is the visionary and unbuildable Stadt Ragnitz project, in which Huth and Domenig designed a theoretical megastructure similar to projects conceptualized by the Metabolists or Archigram.

At the beginning of the 1970s, Huth and Domenig increasingly designed pop-art-architecture. Their temporary buildings for the 1972 Summer Olympics in Munich were colorful and had rounded corners and playful geometries typical of pop art. Their design for a multi-purpose hall at the Institute of the Sisters of St. Francis in Graz-Eggenberg is reminiscent of a tortoise shell and thus characterized as organic architecture. The style of Huth and Domenig combines aspects of all of the aforementioned architectural trends: structuralism, brutalism, metabolism, pop art, and organic architecture. Today, this type of architecture is also known as the Graz School.

Huth's work after 1972 is primarily characterized by participatory planning processes. Huth specialized in the planning of housing estates, in which the future residents were included in the respective planning processes. Examples of these designs include the Gerlitz-Gründe housing estate in Graz-Puntigam, and the Kloepfer estate in Bärnbach. Some of the housing estates were "self-build projects", where residents participated in both the planning and the construction. The style of the housing estates planned by Huth stands in stark contrast to his projects with Domenig. Unlike before, Huth's later projects were based on the aesthetic ideas and preferences of the users. These designs were restrained and downright conservative, instead of aesthetic avant-garde. For example, the houses in the Gerlitz-Gründe housing estate in Graz-Puntigam have cozy mansard roofs.

In the non-participative planned projects of the 1970s and 1980s, Huth continued to design in the style of the Graz School. The ventilation and control buildings of the Plabutsch tunnel in Raach are aesthetically closely related to the multi-purpose hall at the Institute of the Sisters of St. Francis.

Prizes 
 Grand Prix International d'Urbanisme et d'Architecture Cannes (1969), together with Günther Domenig
 European Steel Construction Prize (1975)

Main works

In cooperation with Günther Domenig 

 1963–1968: Pedagogic Academy, Graz
 1965–1969: Parish centre, Oberwart
 1967: Temporary pavilion for the Trigon 67 art exhibition, Graz
 1970–1972: Temporary pavilion for the Olympic swimming pool, Munich
 1970–1973: Temporary restaurant for the 1972 Summer Olympics, Munich
 1973–1977: Institute of the Sisters of St. Francis, a multi-purpose school in Graz-Eggenberg

As an independent architect 

 1967–1968: ÖAAB holiday resort, Ratten
 1968–1973: Research and Computing Center (FRZ) of the VÖEST Alpine Montangesellschaft, Leoben
 1971–1973: Youth center of the Styrian Chamber of Commerce, Graz
 1972–1992: Eschensiedlung housing estate, Deutschlandsberg (scientific research project and participation project)
 1976–1984: Gerlitz-Gründe housing estate, Graz-Puntigam (participation project)
 1977–1982: Housing estate BIG I, Karl-Hubmann-Strasse, Deutschlandsberg (participation project)
 1977–1981: Housing estate, Kaindorf an der Sulm (participation project)
 1979–1983: Kloepfer estate, Bärnbach, (participation project)
 1979–1983: Terraced housing, Graz-Thal, (participation project)
 1980–1983: Housing estate, Rosental an der Kainach (participation project)
 1981–1988: Housing development, Bärnbach (participation project)
 1982–1985: Graz-Algersdorf housing estate, Graz (participation project)
 1982–1985: Residential complex in Voitsberg (participation project)
 1982–1987: Plabutsch tunnel ventilation buildings and control station, Raach
 1982–1992: Modernization of the Peter-Tunner-Building, Leoben
 1986–1992: Ragnitz III residential complex in Graz-Ragnitz (participation project)

Literature 
 Blundell Jones, Peter (1998). Dialogues in Time: new Graz architecture. Haus der Architektur Graz. ISBN 3-901174-36-2.
 Zach, Juliane (Ed.): Eilfried Huth, Architekt – Varietät als Prinzip. Gebr. Mann, Berlin 1996. ISBN 978-3-7861-1709-4.

References 

1930 births
Living people
Architects from Graz
Graz University of Technology alumni
Academic staff of the Berlin University of the Arts
People from Bandung Regency
20th-century Austrian architects